Pseudotelphusa oxychasta is a moth of the family Gelechiidae. It is found in Namibia, South Africa and Zimbabwe.

The wingspan is about 17 mm. The forewings are dark grey speckled white and with a strong black streak from beneath the base of the costa very obliquely to the disc at one-third, then through the middle of the disc finely attenuated to the apex, black tufts just beneath this at one-third and two-thirds, and a black line running from it along the fold. The costal half of the wing is streaked with white between the veins, with some black raised scales towards the costa anteriorly, and a black dot beneath the base of the streak, as well as a terminal series of black dots. The hindwings are grey, paler and thinly scaled in the disc anteriorly.

References

Moths described in 1929
Pseudotelphusa